Wendel is an unincorporated community in Bureau County, Illinois, United States, located along U.S. Route 34, west of Mendota. Wendel is home to the Zion Evangelical Lutheran Church of Clarion, pastored by Kevin Weeks. It is the location of the Clarion Township building, as well as a handful of houses.

References

Unincorporated communities in Bureau County, Illinois
Unincorporated communities in Illinois